Mohamed Emara (born 10 July 1974) is a retired Egyptian football midfielder. He played four seasons in the Bundesliga for Hansa Rostock.

Honours
 Africa Cup of Nations: 1998
 Egyptian Premier League: 1998
 Egypt Cup: 2003

References

External links
 

1974 births
Living people
People from Dakahlia Governorate
Association football midfielders
Egyptian footballers
Egypt international footballers
1999 FIFA Confederations Cup players
1998 African Cup of Nations players
2000 African Cup of Nations players
2002 African Cup of Nations players
Al Ahly SC players
FC Hansa Rostock players
Al Masry SC players
Bundesliga players
Egyptian Premier League players
Egyptian expatriate footballers
Egyptian expatriate sportspeople in Germany
Expatriate footballers in Germany